The women's K-2 500 metres event was a pairs kayaking event conducted as part of the Canoeing at the 1984 Summer Olympics program.

Medalists

Results

Heats
Ten crews entered in two heats on August 6. The top three finishers from each of the heats advanced directly to the final while the remaining four teams were relegated to the semifinal.

Semifinal
The top three finishers in the semifinal (raced on August 8) advanced to the final.

Final
The final was held on August 10.

References
1984 Summer Olympics official report Volume 2, Part 2. p. 364. 
Sports-reference.com 1984 women's K-2 500 m results.

Women's K-2 500
Olympic
Women's events at the 1984 Summer Olympics